Hyperthaema perflammans is a moth of the subfamily Arctiinae. It was described by George Hampson in 1916. It is found in Peru.

References

 

Phaegopterina
Moths described in 1916